"Beer with Jesus" is a song recorded by American country music singer Thomas Rhett. It was released in September 2012 as the second single from his debut album, It Goes Like This. Rhett wrote the song with Rick Huckaby and Lance Miller.

Critical reception
Billy Dukes of Taste of Country gave the song three and a half stars out of five, writing that "the song benefits from an inherited familiarity […], allowing one to enjoy it more easily after just one listen." Matt Bjorke of Roughstock gave the song a favorable review, saying that it "absolutely redeems him from the clumsy ditty that was 'Something to Do with My Hands'" but "it could be a tough road ahead for Thomas Rhett if this interesting albeit done before lyric doesn't help break him out with radio." Kevin John Coyne of Country Universe gave the song a B+ grade, writing that "Rhett’s slightly ragged vocal is charmingly innocent and sincere" and "the production does such a great job of not getting in the way of the song."

Music video
The music video was directed by Peter Zavadil and premiered in November 2012.

Chart performance
"Beer with Jesus" debuted at number 49 on the U.S. Billboard Hot Country Songs chart for the week of September 8, 2012.

Year-end charts

Certifications

References

2012 singles
2012 songs
Country ballads
2010s ballads
Thomas Rhett songs
Song recordings produced by Jay Joyce
Music videos directed by Peter Zavadil
Songs written by Thomas Rhett
Songs about alcohol
Big Machine Records singles
Songs written by Lance Miller
Songs about Jesus